Christopher John Kourakis (born 17 June 1958) is a Greek Australian lawyer and judge. Since 2012 he has been Chief Justice of South Australia.

Early life and education
Kourakis was born on 17 June 1958 grew up in Port Lincoln as one of ten children of Greek migrants Evangelos and Roxani Kourakis. His parents originated from the Greek island of Ikaria. 

He was educated at the University of Adelaide.

Career
Kourakis practised at the Independent Bar in South Australia from 1989 and was appointed Queen's Counsel in 1997. He was President of the Law Society of South Australia from 2001. In 2003 he was appointed as the Solicitor-General of South Australia. 

When the South Australian government decided to cease appointing Queen's Counsel and the Chief Justice of South Australia began appointing Senior Counsel, Kourakis resigned his commission as Queen's Counsel to become Senior Counsel instead.

In 2008, Kourakis was appointed to the Supreme Court of South Australia and in 2012, he was elevated to the position of Chief Justice.

In August 2022, he overturned a decision by the former Premier of South Australia, Steven Marshall, to allow for exploratory mining to go ahead on Lake Torrens, citing concerns that Kelaray's heritage plan and procedures would "substantially detract" from the Aboriginal Heritage Act 1988.

In February 2023, together with Attorney-General of South Australia Kyam Maher, Kourakis announced several new appointments to the SA judicial system. Among the appointees were the first two Aboriginal Australians to be appointed to the Magistrates Court of South Australia, Lana Chester and Natalie Brown.

References

1958 births
Australian people of Greek descent
Living people
Adelaide Law School alumni
Australian King's Counsel
Australian Senior Counsel
Solicitors-General of South Australia
Chief Justices of South Australia
People from Port Lincoln
Judges of the Supreme Court of South Australia
20th-century Australian judges